Peter Bruce L. McNaughton  is a Canadian neuroscientist and Distinguished Professor at the University of California, Irvine (UC Irvine), as well as a Professor of Neuroscience and director of the Polaris Brain Dynamics research group at The Canadian Centre for Behavioural Neuroscience. He joined the faculty of UC Irvine in 2014, after having taught at the University of Lethbridge for six years. He had moved his lab from the University of Arizona to the University of Lethbridge in 2008 after winning the Polaris Award from the Alberta Heritage Foundation for Medical Research. He was elected as a Fellow of the Royal Society of Canada in 2016. He is also a lifetime member of the Royal Norwegian Society of Sciences and Letters.

References

External links
Faculty page

Canadian neuroscientists
Living people
Fellows of the Royal Society of Canada
Carleton University alumni
Dalhousie University alumni
University of Arizona faculty
Academic staff of the University of Lethbridge
University of California, Irvine faculty
Royal Norwegian Society of Sciences and Letters
Year of birth missing (living people)